Fathers 4 Justice (or F4J) is a fathers’ rights organisation in the United Kingdom. Founded in 2001, the group aims to gain public and parliamentary support for changes in UK legislation on fathers' rights, mainly using stunts and protests, often conducted in costume.

Former F4J members, who do not agree with Matt O'Connor's leadership, formed the New Fathers 4 Justice group, in 2008.

History
Fathers 4 Justice was founded in the UK by Matt O'Connor, a marketing consultant. He is the sole shareholder and a director of Fathers For Justice Ltd.

Fathers For Justice stated aim is to champion the causes of equal parenting, family law reform, and equal contact for divorced parents with children. It is best known for its campaigning techniques of protest stunts, with participants often dressed as comic superheroes, and frequently climbing public buildings, bridges, and monuments.

Stunts have included supporters forcibly entering courts dressed in Father Christmas outfits, putting the Government's Minister for Children in handcuffs, and group member Jason Hatch climbing onto Buckingham Palace dressed as Batman. They have also protested by handcuffing two other government ministers. Former members of the group have claimed Fathers4Justice/the Matt O' Connor family, have "lost its way" by being sidetracked from reforming family law, and descending into personal attacks on Twitter, libel (for which they were sued), and allegations of illegal acts such as putting an MP under surveillance and tracking her movements with a GPS tracking unit.

Activities

On 17 December 2002, O'Connor and a small group of supporters staged their first protest by storming the Lord Chancellor's Office dressed as Father Christmas. In January 2003, O'Connor officially founded Fathers 4 Justice. The group targeted the homes of family court judges, and family lawyers' homes and offices, with protests.

On 21 October 2003, campaigners Eddie "Goldtooth" Gorecki and Jonathan "Jolly" Stanesby scaled the Royal Courts of Justice, dressed respectively as Batman and Robin. The following day, the group's members protested through London in a military tank in support of Goreckwi and Stanesby. Nine days later, David Chick climbed a  crane near Tower Bridge, London while dressed as Spider-Man. The Metropolitan Police set up a cordon around the area that disrupted traffic through some of East London for several days. Chick was subsequently cleared of criminal charges and published a ghost-written autobiography in February 2006. On the morning of 22 December 2003, four campaigners — Eddie Gorecki, Jolly Stanesby, Michael Sadeh and Steve Battlershill — dressed as Father Christmas and climbed Tower Bridge in London. They hung up a banner calling for the resignation of the Minister for Children, Margaret Hodge, whom they held responsible for perceived inequalities in family law. The four were charged with conspiracy, but the charge was dropped at the start of the trial a year later.

In 2004, Stanesby carried out a "citizen's arrest" of Hodge at a conference, handcuffing himself to her and stating: "Margaret Hodge, I'm arresting you for covering up child abuse." Both Stanseby and Jason Hatch (who had also attempted to handcuff himself to Hodge) were later cleared by a jury of charges of false imprisonment. On 19 May 2004, an alert was caused when two members of the group threw purple flour bombs at Tony Blair during Prime Minister's Questions at the House of Commons. Charged with public order offences, activist Guy Harrison was fined £600, and Ron Davis given a conditional discharge. Following the House of Commons incident, The Times wrote that the group "has succeeded in becoming the most prominent guerrilla pressure group in Britain ... within eighteen months of its founding". In September 2004, member Jason Hatch climbed the walls of Buckingham Palace dressed as Batman. All charges relating to his protest were later dropped. Also in September, David Chick climbed the London Eye, forcing the attraction to close. He was found not guilty of charges of causing a public nuisance.

In May 2005, campaigners dressed as superheroes protested on top of the Crucible Theatre in Sheffield during the World Snooker Championship. Five years later, campaigners interrupted an interview with Steve Davis, causing the BBC to cut to a pre-recorded video segment. Protester Ray Barry climbed St Peter's Collegiate Church in Wolverhampton on Fathers Day in 2005. He was cleared of a charge of a public order offence, and then repeated the protest on Christmas Day. On 27 September 2005, protester Guy Harrison climbed the Palace of Westminster unveiling a banner stating "Does Blair care? For Fawkes sake change family law". A jury acquitted him of the charge of committing a public nuisance offence. In November 2005, the group received negative publicity when the prime-time ITV programme Tonight With Trevor McDonald appeared to expose some of its members as violent and obnoxious in their behaviour. However, counter-claims have been made that these individuals were never members in the first place and that the programme gave no right to reply. Some members were expelled, but the organisation defended its position and attacked the documentary. On 23 November 2005, Fathers 4 Justice ended its truce with the Children and Family Court Advisory and Support Service (CAFCASS) and the Child Support Agency (CPS), calling for a public inquiry into family law.

During January 2006, the newspaper The Sun published a story in which it claimed F4J members planned to kidnap Leo Blair, the young son of former Prime Minister Tony Blair "for a few hours as a symbolic gesture". The police said they were aware of such a plan, but added it had probably never progressed beyond the "chattering stage". Downing Street refused to confirm or deny the existence of a plot as it does not comment on matters concerning the prime minister's children. Founder O'Connor condemned the alleged plot and threatened to shut down the group because of it. Within days, Fathers 4 Justice had been disbanded. The group re-formed in May of the same year, and protested during the showing of the BBC lottery show The National Lottery: Jet Set. The show was taken off-air for several minutes after six Fathers 4 Justice protesters ran from the audience onto the stage displaying posters. They were soon removed from the studio and the lottery draws were hurriedly finished in order to start coverage of the 2006 Eurovision Song Contest. A group spokesman stated afterwards that the incident marked a "dramatic return" of Fathers 4 Justice. In March 2006, F4J member and barrister Michael Cox was jailed for refusing to pay money he owed to the Child Support Agency. Cox told a hearing in Southampton he refused to pay on principle, as he had joint custody of his children, and his former wife wrote to the court in support of him.

On 8 June 2008, two fathers from Fathers 4 Justice climbed onto the roof of Labour Party deputy leader Harriet Harman's house wearing superhero-style costumes and calling themselves "Captain Conception" and "Cash Gordon". One of the pair, Mark Harris, said he wanted fathers to have the same rights as their children's mothers' new partners. He also said they would not come down unless Harman read his book, Family Court Hell. Harris later received a conditional discharge, while his colleague Jolly Stanesby was jailed for two months. In the same month, Bristol Family Court was evacuated after a fire alarm was set off in the building during a F4J protest outside the building. On 9 July 2008, Fathers 4 Justice members Nigel Ace and Tony Ashby, this time in Spider-Man and Batman outfits, climbed Harman's roof and draped a banner that read "Stop The War On Dads". Ace, in the Spider-Man costume, called for legal reforms through a loudhailer on the roof.

In July 2011, F4J founder Matt O'Connor staged a hunger strike just outside UK Prime Minister David Cameron's home in Oxfordshire, demanding that he honour what O'Connor said were pledges about grandparents' rights to see their grandchildren and over shared parenting.

In 2012, F4J staged a naked protest inside the Oxford Street branch of retailer Marks and Spencer in order to protest the shop's advertising on parenting website Mumsnet, which F4J believes "promotes gender hatred".

In June 2013, Paul Manning glued a picture of his 11-year-old son to John Constable's 1821 painting The Hay Wain in the National Gallery in London. Two weeks earlier, Tim Haries had spraypainted the word "Help" on a portrait of Queen Elizabeth at Westminster Abbey. The group's founder, Matt O'Connor, announced that he would target other art works in order to highlight his campaign. On 9 August 2013, Fathers 4 Justice protester Martyn Judd climbed onto the balcony of the Hilton Birmingham Metropole Hotel to protest what he asserted to be the inequality of fathers' treatment in family court cases during a CAFCASS conference at the hotel. The protest came to an end when sprinklers flooded the hotel.

In January 2014, Fathers 4 Justice publicly withdrew support for Manning, following alleged breaches of their Terms & Conditions. On 8 January 2014, Tim Haries was found guilty of defacing the portrait of the Queen. On 5 February 2014, Haries was sentenced by Judge McCreath at Southwark Crown Court to six months in custody.

On 30 November 2015, two men involved with the group were arrested after a few hours of standing on the roof of Queens Gallery, an art gallery on Buckingham Palace grounds.

Three Fathers4Justice protesters stormed the stage of ITV's Loose Women shouting "No Kids No Cash", on 15 June 2016. The show was briefly taken off air.

On 22 August 2016, Matt O’Connor, a 49-year-old campaigner for Fathers4Justice, walked on stage dressed as a priest during a live broadcast of the Rose of Tralee during Cavan Rose Lisa Reilly’s interview with host Dáithí Ó Sé.  He was removed from the stage by security staff before being taken away by Gardaí.

Early Day Motion 210
In June 2013, George Galloway sponsored the Shared Parenting Early Day Motion 210 in the House of Commons which mentioned Fathers4Justice:

That this House notes that many fathers convicted of no criminal offence have very limited access to their children as a result of decisions made by the family courts following separation or divorce; further notes that the family courts operate in conditions of secrecy in which there is a lack of public accountability for the decisions they make; believes that mothers, children and fathers all have rights in relation to family contact and access where there has been family breakdown; further believes there should not be a presumption that family breakdown is the primary responsibility of either parent; further believes that where there is palpably no threat to children from their father in the context of family breakdown, the courts should try to maximise reasonable access in the interests of the children; and calls on the Government to review the operation of the family courts in general and their decision-making in relation to fathers' access to children in the context of family breakdown in particular, taking into account the testimony of the many thousands of fathers who feel their rights are being ignored or abused in relation to their children and in particular the organisation Fathers4Justice and the 36,000 families it represents.
The Early Day Motion attracted cross-party political support from MPs including David Blunkett, David Lammy, Gerald Kaufman, Frank Field, John Redwood, John Hemming and Caroline Lucas.

However, none of the signatories of the EDM, including George Galloway who sponsored it, actually spoke in the final debate on the Children & Families Bill on 10 February 2014, or objected to Lords' amendment 12, which "watered down" the Bill's legislative powers on shared parenting. Nevertheless, non-signatories to the EDM, including MPs who were criticised by Fathers4Justice such as Caroline Nokes, did speak in favour of shared parenting, and criticised the amendment, saying, "I was elected on a promise to seek a legal presumption in favour of automatic shared contact, something that the Bill achieved before the amendment was added, but clause 11, as amended, will not deliver what we promised." Nokes also said: "The amendment plays into the hands of obstructive resident parents who wish to prevent a child from having a meaningful, ongoing relationship with an absent parent, and puts us back into a situation of winners and losers".

Criticism
Members of the group have been accused of conducting intimidating attacks in order to upset court staff, family lawyers and Members of Parliament. During protests outside the offices of the Children and Family Court Advisory and Support Service (CAFCASS), individual case workers were identified by name. One office of CAFCASS was forcibly entered by F4J members, who detained an unnamed employee. No criminal proceedings are known to have resulted.

Impact
Fathers 4 Justice's main focus remains upon media coverage and legal treatment of fathers' rights issues in the UK. The use of high-profile and disruptive stunts has garnered significant UK media coverage, but the political aims of the group are as yet unachieved. The group has been accused of missing the opportunity to change legislation when it refused to table amendments to the Children and Families Bill in 2013. One of its central aims, the removal of secrecy surrounding family courts, is the subject of political debate. In 2006, the Court of Appeal set a precedent allowing adults to discuss secret cases after they had concluded. This resulted in a number of high-profile scandals, chiefly concerning adoption. In February 2009, Justice Minister Jack Straw announced plans to reverse the ruling.  In a landmark ruling in September 2013, Sir James Munby, President of the Family Division of the High Court of Justice in England and Wales, spoke in support of previously 'secret' courts being exposed to public scrutiny, with an order that permitted a family whose children had been removed to speak publicly about their treatment by child safety officials.

An unintended result of the F4J campaign has been the exposure of flaws in security at Buckingham Palace, resulting in security enquiries or reviews there and at the House of Commons.

See also
 Child custody
 Fathers' rights movement in the UK
 Parental alienation
 Parental alienation syndrome
 Pressure groups in the United Kingdom
 Shared parenting

References

External links
 Fathers 4 Justice – official website
 Lottery show delayed by protest
 Fathers' rights group scale abbey 13 April 2006
 Bob Geldof supports Fathers for Justice calling them heroic after critics attack their leadership. 27 May 2005
 BBC iCan: Fathers' rights 12 July 2004

2002 establishments in the United Kingdom
Family and parenting issues groups in the United Kingdom
Fathers' rights
Fathers' rights organizations
Gender equality
Organizations established in 2002
Political advocacy groups in the United Kingdom